Vakhtang "Vato" Arveladze (born 4 March 1998) is a Georgian footballer who plays as an attacking midfielder for the Azerbaijani club Neftçi and Georgia national team.

Club career
In May 2018, Arveladze joined Polish club Korona Kielce from Locomotivi Tbilisi, signing a two-year contract lasting until 2020, with an option of extending for another year. He made his professional debut for Korona in the Ekstraklasa on 28 July 2018, coming on as a substitute for Elhadji Pape Diaw in the 70th minute of the home match against Legia Warsaw, which finished as a 1–2 loss.

International career
Arveladze was included in the squad of hosts Georgia for the 2017 UEFA European Under-19 Championship, where the team were eliminated in the group stage. He was called up to the senior national team for the first time in March 2019 for the UEFA Euro 2020 qualifying matches against Switzerland and the Republic of Ireland. He made his debut on 26 March 2019, when he started in the game against Ireland.

Personal life
Arveladze is the son of retired professional footballer Revaz Arveladze. Vato was born in the German city of Homburg, Saarland, where his father played. Both of his father's younger twin brothers, Shota and Archil, were also professional footballers, with all three appearing for the Georgia national team. Shota, now a manager, is the all-time top scorer for Georgia, having scored 26 goals for the country.

Career statistics

International

International goals
Scores and results list Georgia's goal tally first.

References

External links
 
 
 
 

1998 births
Living people
Footballers from Georgia (country)
Expatriate footballers from Georgia (country)
People from Homburg, Saarland
Footballers from Saarland
Association football midfielders
Georgia (country) youth international footballers
Georgia (country) under-21 international footballers
Georgia (country) international footballers
FC Lokomotivi Tbilisi players
Korona Kielce players
Fatih Karagümrük S.K. footballers
Neftçi PFK players
Erovnuli Liga players
Ekstraklasa players
Süper Lig players
Azerbaijan Premier League players
Expatriate sportspeople from Georgia (country) in Poland
Expatriate sportspeople from Georgia (country) in Turkey
Expatriate sportspeople from Georgia (country) in Azerbaijan
Expatriate footballers in Poland
Expatriate footballers in Turkey
Expatriate footballers in Azerbaijan